Michael Vincent Wenden,  (born 17 November 1949) is a champion swimmer who represented Australia in the 1968 Summer Olympics and 1972 Summer Olympics. In 1968 he won four medals: gold in both the 100- and 200-metre freestyle (setting world records in each) and a silver and a bronze in freestyle relays.

Wenden was inducted into the International Swimming Hall of Fame in 1979. He was one of the eight bearers of the Olympic Flag at the opening ceremony of the 2000 Summer Olympics in Sydney.

Wenden was appointed an MBE in 1969 and made a Member of the Order of Australia (AM) in the 2006 Australia Day Honours for "service to the Olympic movement as an administrator and competitor".

Wenden holds a Bachelor of Commerce from the University of New South Wales. His daughter Karen Baildon (née Wenden) competed in swimming at the Queensland state level and won the 1989 Miss Universe Miss Photogenic title. She is married to Olympic swimmer Andrew Baildon.

See also
 List of members of the International Swimming Hall of Fame
 List of Commonwealth Games medallists in swimming (men)
 List of Olympic medalists in swimming (men)
 World record progression 100 metres freestyle
 World record progression 4 × 200 metres freestyle relay

References

External links
 
 
 
 
 

1949 births
Living people
Swimmers from Sydney
Olympic swimmers of Australia
Swimmers at the 1968 Summer Olympics
Swimmers at the 1972 Summer Olympics
Olympic gold medalists for Australia
Olympic silver medalists for Australia
Olympic bronze medalists for Australia
World record setters in swimming
Australian Members of the Order of the British Empire
Members of the Order of Australia
Commonwealth Games gold medallists for Australia
Commonwealth Games silver medallists for Australia
Commonwealth Games bronze medallists for Australia
University of New South Wales alumni
Olympic bronze medalists in swimming
Australian male freestyle swimmers
World Aquatics Championships medalists in swimming
Swimmers at the 1966 British Empire and Commonwealth Games
Swimmers at the 1970 British Commonwealth Games
Swimmers at the 1974 British Commonwealth Games
Medalists at the 1968 Summer Olympics
Olympic gold medalists in swimming
Olympic silver medalists in swimming
Commonwealth Games medallists in swimming
Sport Australia Hall of Fame inductees
20th-century Australian people
Medallists at the 1966 British Empire and Commonwealth Games
Medallists at the 1970 British Commonwealth Games
Medallists at the 1974 British Commonwealth Games